Larries are a group of shipping conspiracy theorist One Direction fans who believe that former bandmates Harry Styles and Louis Tomlinson have a long-term and secret romantic relationship. A fundamental part of this conspiracy theory is that the two, name blended as "Larry Stylinson" ("Larry" for short), have been closeted by their management company, Modest Management, supposedly guided by homophobic corporate interests. This conspiracy is also called "Larry is Real."

Despite repeated public disavowals, particularly by the more outspoken Tomlinson, belief in the theory has not diminished over time. Larries have been one of the largest groups of the One Direction fandom since the band's early days.

History

Beginnings 
One Direction formed on The X Factor in 2010 and the self-called Larries formed soon after, inspired by the pair's close and public friendship. Since the beginning, most Larries have been insistent that Styles and Tomlinson's relationship is real. According to an anonymous One Direction fan interviewed by The Daily Dot in 2012, "There’s no real space in fandom for people who ship Harry/Louis in the fictional sense." However, Larries were not the majority of the fanbase (called "Directioners"), with only "a couple thousand" Larries estimated to exist by one fan in 2012. 

Ever since the Larry conspiracy began, the passion of this group of fans has caused the harassment of Styles and Tomlinson, their friends and family, and journalists covering Larries. As early as 2012, Tomlinson admitted that the popularity of the theory was negatively affecting the way he and Styles behaved in public. Tomlinson also referred to Larry as "bullshit" and "conspiracy theories" on Twitter around this time. This did not deter conspiracy theorist fans from regularly speculating when Styles and Tomlinson might announce their relationship to the public.

Crazy About One Direction 
In 2013, British documentarian Daisy Asquith was tasked by Channel 4 to create a television documentary about fans of One Direction. She interviewed fans at a Manchester show, making sure to both engage fans' parents and to locate fans who would be emotionally prepared to be featured on television. Channel 4 pressured her to feature "the crazy fans" and, at the last minute, changed the name of the documentary from "I Heart One Direction" to "Crazy About One Direction." To many One Direction fans, the depictions of fans wearing One Direction-themed outfits, making fan art, and engaging in "insane" behaviors were interpreted as public shaming. In response to the documentary and the outrage, One Direction member Liam Payne tweeted, "We couldn't give a fuck what any documentary says  dramatised for entertainment and full of bullshit anyway we all know..."

Within 24 hours of Crazy About One Direction's release, an unsubstantiated rumor that 42 fans who believed in the Larry Stylinson theory had committed suicide as a result of the documentary circulated online, with #RIPLarryShippers trending on Twitter. Notably, the faked suicides were constructed both in response to the film and in response to anti-Larries using the documentary as an excuse to criticize Larrie behaviors. Asquith and Channel 4 also received bomb threats and death threats. In the documentary, Larries were accused of bringing shame onto the One Direction fandom by making all One Direction fans look crazy. Hashtags like #thisisnotus were used by One Direction members to separate themselves from Larries after the documentary's release. The increased visibility of the Larry Stylinson conspiracy theory and perceived public shaming caused their ranks to tighten and their beliefs to become more extreme.

"Rainbow Bondage Bears" and other symbols 
By 2014, Larries believed that Tomlinson and Styles were sending secret messages directly to them. The most notable manifestation of this belief came in the form of "Rainbow Bondage Bears" that could be seen onstage at One Direction concerts in 2014 and 2015. These stuffed bears (originally owned by fans who threw them onstage during concerts) were later placed onstage during concerts and dressed in costumes reminiscent of prominent gay icons, such as Freddie Mercury and Judy Garland. Sometimes the bears seemed to hint at the Larry conspiracy, such as when a sign next to the bear said "Love Larry" with a picture of Larry Grayson attached. The context of the bears is still unclear, but the band has denied it having any significance to the personal lives of Styles or Tomlinson. 

In addition to the Rainbow Bondage Bears, fans have invented other symbolism that might signify Styles and Tomlinson are trying to communicate with them about their secret love for one another. The unsubstantiated claims include:

 Styles and Tomlinson have matching tattoos. One example is Styles' rose and Tomlinson's dagger, which supposedly to form a common rose-and-dagger tattoo design that represents tragic love. The tattoos of swallows on Styles' chest supposedly represent himself and Tomlinson, with the larger bird representing Styles due to its unusual slanted eyebrow, and the smaller bird representing Tomlinson's smaller size.
 The colors green and blue appearing represent Styles and Tomlinson respectively. The association is due to Styles using green tape on his wireless microphone and Tomlinson using blue tape on his wireless microphone when they would tour while in One Direction. The color blue has also been noted as the color of Tomlinson's eyes.
 Styles and Tomlinson are invested in a form of numerology related to the number 28, which Larries believe to be related to Styles and Tomlinson's supposed wedding day, September 28, 2013. The number has been found in many things, from Tomlinson's number 28 football jersey to the release date of Styles' movie Dunkirk (7/21) adding up to the number 28.

This obscure clue-finding process has allowed the conspiracy theory to sustain itself up to the present day, despite Styles and Tomlinson being noticeably absent from each other's lives since One Direction went on indefinite hiatus in 2016.

Babygate 
When Tomlinson's friend got pregnant in 2015, Larries found it difficult to believe that he was going to have a biological child while also being in a monogamous relationship with Styles. To cope with the cognitive dissonance, the conspiracy theory called "babygate" was created. The theory asserts the pregnancy was fake and manufactured by his management. Larries claim that the "baby" born from the pregnancy was at first a doll, but as the "baby" aged, it was replaced by an actor or another member of his friend's family. The bodies and behavior of Tomlinson and his friend were scrutinized for signs that she was faking the pregnancy, and photos of them were analyzed in Photoshop for signs of editing.

Solo careers 
One Direction's breakup splintered the fanbase into seven distinct (though sometimes overlapping) factions: Harries (fans of Harry Styles), Louies (fans of Louis Tomlinson), Zquad (fans of Zayn Malik), Niall Horan stans, Liam Payne stans, OT4/OT5s (fans of One Direction generally) and Larries. Some Harries and Louies are former Larries and self-identify as ex-Larries. There is also a substantial community of One Direction-adjacent fans called "antis" who spend large amounts of time online countering the things that Larries say and do. Ex-Larries often contribute to this anti-conspiracy work by creating posts invoking the experience of "leaving a cult."

Since the beginning of his solo career, Styles has been dressing androgynously, singing songs and making music videos invoking sexual fluidity, and waving pride flags at his concerts. He has also refused to label his sexuality. To deal with the cognitive dissonance of Styles behaving this way while Tomlinson has explicitly stated he is straight, Larries have constructed a martyrdom narrative for Tomlinson. Tomlinson is seen as being kept "in chains" so that Styles can experience a life where he is commercially successful and sexually free. At the same time, many Larries still hold the contradictory belief that Styles dates women as an attempt to hide his relationship with Tomlinson. This has resulted in the harassment of Styles' then girlfriend Olivia Wilde on TikTok.

Content 

The core evidence of the conspiracy is often introduced through video clips that frame brief glances, touches, or other mundane interpersonal interactions as romantic gestures. These videos, sometimes turned into gifs on platforms like Tumblr or gathered into compilations on platforms like YouTube, make an impact on the viewer through repetition. For example, a hug between Styles and Tomlinson became a "prized Larry Stylinson moment" by the way fans shared differently angled photographs of the moment, including it as a highlight in videos, and used it as inspiration for fan art and fan fiction.

People who become intrigued by the conspiracy may be directed to more detailed written content, which ranges from day-by-day timelines of their relationship to intricate explanations of the babygate theory. Many accounts that update on One Direction, Styles, and Tomlinson are run by Larries who will only post content that aligns with the conspiracy, and new Larries are encouraged to only follow them. One former Larrie, when interviewed about this type of censorship, reported that accounts "wouldn't reblog updates or photos about 'beard' relationships" and that Styles' many gay friends were also ignored by these accounts because "it didn't fit a narrative of him as an oppressed gay man."As of 2020, Larry Stylinson is the most reblogged ship on Tumblr.

Erotic slash fiction with Larry exists, as do other forms of fan art, including "femslash", which depicts Larry as loving girls. Artist Owen G Parry made several Larry-themed artworks that were displayed in a 2016 London exhibition. Parry says that Larry shipping can be "a safe place to test out your sexuality, a fantasy space" for many young fans. Tomlinson said of Larry fanfiction in 2022 that "It's weird, all that shit but there's not much you can do about it. I’d rather they didn't, but it is what it is, I won't be watching."

Ideology

Justification for beliefs 
Styles and Tomlinson's decreased interaction over the years has caused conspiracy theorist fans to view themselves as "mouthpieces" for the two men.

Kaitlyn Tiffany, author and Directioner, states that "... [Larries] would often kind of accuse other fans of being homophobic if they didn’t support Larry Stylinson. [...] Anti-Larries would often dwell on Larries and try to pick apart their logic and shout them down in a way that was maybe unnecessary. It became a huge distraction." She also says that non-Larry Directioners dislike media coverage that made the Larries something of the public face of the fandom.

Queering the fangirl 
As of 2022, Larries are generally women around 20.

Academics Clare Southerton and Hannah McCann say:Larries have been portrayed largely as a bizarre expression of the wider Directioner fandom, an inexplicable post-truth variation of the hysterical fangirl. [...] Larries reveal complex forms of desire that appear to belong more to the collective-the desiring community-than to the individual. Queering the figure of the fangirl, we find that far from simply lusting after their boyband idols, Larries desire desire itself. While fake news framings are concerned with getting to "truth," they often miss the overarching sociopolitical paradigms [...] The ultimate lesson from the Larry fandom is not proof of whether Larry is real, but rather, the creation of a space for the queerness of Larry to be real, whether really real, or not. They also comment on the fan-group's complex relation to slash fiction and queerbaiting.

Accusations of misogyny 
Larries have bullied and harassed Styles' and Tomlinson's girlfriends. The harassment extended to include the mother of Tomlinson's child, the family of one of his girlfriends, as well as an unrelated family with the same surname.

In context of related communities 
Larry Stylinson was not the first real person fiction (RPF) conspiracy that drew large numbers of "tinhats", fans who believe the public figures they ship really are in a secret relationship. The term was first coined in 2003 as a derogatory way to refer to fans who believed Elijah Wood and Dominic Monaghan had a secret relationship that formed while working on the set of Lord of the Rings. Other pairings with similar theories surrounding them include actors Jensen Ackles and Jared Padalecki from the CW television show Supernatural, as well as singer-songwriter Taylor Swift and model Karlie Kloss. 

"Babygate" is also not alone in speculation that celebrity pregnancies and babies are fake. Benedict Cumberbatch has been subjected to fans speculating about his wife's pregnancy. Zayn Malik and Liam Payne have also been subjected to "babygates" of their own. According to academic Anna Martin, these conspiracies are so common because "Star texts allow for fantasies not only of wealth and leisure, but of a life in which love is the only concern."  Kaitlyn Tiffany, writing for The Atlantic, observed, "Modern theories about 'fake' celebrity babies come with a cocktail of resentment toward the hypocrisy of celebrity, the dishonesty of the media, and the unflappable confidence of the elite, who get away with whatever they want [. . .] The internet didn't invent conspiracism, but it did make spreading conspiracy theories easier and more fun."

Like many other conspiracy theorists, Larries have a strong presence on social media, and on TikTok in particular. The #larrystylinson tag on TikTok has 7.5 billion collective views as of May 2022. The spread of conspiracy theories on TikTok is well documented. According to anthropologist Joseph Russo, "In a moment in which young people feel they're living in a really chaotic world where not much makes sense, certain conspiracy theories can feel like a security blanket, because they tell us there is actually an order underneath it all." Academic Abby Richards, who researches disinformation on TikTok, has said of conspiracy theories, "We've seen that time and time again this can absolutely translate to real-world harm." However, academics Hannah McCann and Clare Southerton question the motives behind "dismissing Larries as merely dangerous" and, further, question what paradigm they might be dangerous to. They say that framing Larries exclusively as consumers and spreaders of fake news "miss[es] the overarching socio-political paradigms that shape what can be seen, heard, and represented in the first instance." Kaitlyn Tiffany challenges this viewpoint, claiming fans were "robbed" of neutrality towards Larry once it was seen as "serious business" due to it interfering with Styles and Tomlinson's personal lives.

In popular culture 
Larries have appeared in popular culture outside their own fandom, examples include:

 The 2017 young adult novel Grace and the Fever was inspired by the Larry fandom. 
 In 2019, the teen drama Euphoria depicted an animated sex scene between Styles and Tomlinson due to one of its characters, Kat, being a notorious One Direction fanfic writer. The show portrays Kat as the inventor of the Larry Stylinson ship. Following the release of the episode, both Larry conspiracy theorists and non-conspiracy theorist fans of Styles and Tomlinson expressed outrage that the ship was portrayed in the show. Styles and Tomlinson had not approved the sequence.
 Kaitlyn Tiffany's 2022 book on One Direction fandom, Everything I need I get from you: how fangirls created the Internet as we know it, spends two chapters on Larries.

See also
 List of most-retweeted tweets, which includes a 2011 tweet from Tomlinson to Styles, noted among Larries and to some extent, the larger One Direction fandom
 Stan (fan), an excessively avid fan

References

External links
Larrie, article at Fanlore

Celebrity fandom
One Direction
Harry Styles
LGBT culture
2010s in Internet culture
2020s in Internet culture
Music fandom
Slash fiction
LGBT-related conspiracy theories